Junior is a 1994 American comedy film directed and produced by Ivan Reitman, and starring Arnold Schwarzenegger, Danny DeVito and Emma Thompson. The film follows Alex Hesse, an Austrian-American scientist who agrees to undergo a male pregnancy from a newly developed drug Expectane.

The film was released in the United States the day before Thanksgiving on November 23, 1994, to mixed reception and did not match the box office performance of Reitman's earlier films starring Schwarzenegger: 1988's Twins, which also starred DeVito and Schwarzenegger as a comedic duo, and 1990's Kindergarten Cop. Schwarzenegger and Thompson received Golden Globe Award nominations for their performances. The film's theme song, Patty Smyth's "Look What Love Has Done" was also recognized, going on to be nominated for the Academy Award for Best Original Song.

Plot
Austrian research geneticist Dr. Alex Hesse and his OB/GYN colleague Dr. Larry Arbogast invent a fertility drug, "Expectane", designed to reduce the chances of a miscarriage. With the drug unapproved by the Food and Drug Administration (FDA), the colleagues are unable to test the drug and cannot continue their research. Head of the review board Noah Banes informs Larry that while the FDA denied human experimentation, the team has received a donation from geneticist Dr. Diana Reddin from the ovum cryogenics department.

Alex plans to start over in Europe, but Larry suggests they can still perform the experiment, with Canadian firm Lyndon Pharmaceutical offering to fund them provided they find a volunteer. Alex questions the likelihood of a pregnant woman taking an unapproved drug, but Larry suggests omitting the volunteer's gender and convinces him to impregnate himself with an ovum codenamed "Junior".

That night, Alex dreams his potential offspring has his own face. As weeks go by, he complains to Larry of sore nipples, and chats incessantly about walks, massages, and naps. Contemplating fatherhood after watching television commercials, Alex breaks down sobbing. When the time comes for Alex to end the experiment and release the results to Lyndon Pharmaceutical, he continues taking the drug and decides to carry the pregnancy to term; initially annoyed, Larry agrees to keep it hidden. Alex develops a relationship with Diana, and reveals his pregnancy to Angela, Larry's ex-wife, who also happens to be pregnant by Aerosmith's personal trainer.

Diana is stunned and angry when it is revealed that the "Junior" ovum is hers, and Banes attempts to take credit for the experiment. Disguised as a woman, Alex hides in a retreat for expectant mothers, blaming his masculine appearance on anabolic steroid use. Diana visits, telling him it does not matter who is pregnant because he is the father and she is the mother. Larry reveals the experiment's data to Lyndon Pharmaceutical, who agree to partner with them.

Alex experiences abdominal pain from the start of labor, calling for Larry and Diana. As Diana rushes to the resort, Larry tells a fellow doctor to prepare for an emergency cesarean section. A hospital staffer overhears and alerts Banes, who summons the media and the University Dean, hoping to take credit for the world's first pregnant man. Warned by a colleague, Larry creates a decoy for Alex to allow a private c-section. When Larry arrives, the news media only see the pregnant Angela, discrediting Banes, who is fired by the Dean. Diana and Alex enter the hospital by the fire escape, and he has an emergency c-section. Sent to keep Angela company in the waiting room, Diana finds her in labor and becomes her delivery coach. Alex gives birth to a healthy baby girl, and Larry announces the arrival to Diana, who is assisting Angela with contractions. Diana leaves Angela with Larry and rushes to see the baby, whom she and Alex name Junior. Larry delivers Angela's child and they reconcile to raise the boy, Jake, as their own.

One year later, the families all go on vacation together and celebrate the birthdays of Junior and Jake. Diana is pregnant with their second child, and Angela mentions wanting another baby but not wishing to endure pregnancy again; they all try to convince a reluctant Larry to carry the child.

Cast

Production
Originally developed under the title of Oh Baby, the film was announced during production of Reitman's Dave as a reteam for him and Schwarzenegger. Emma Thompson signed to star in February 1994 following her Academy Award Nominations for The Remains of the Day and In the Name of the Father.

Reception

Box office
Following the successful collaborations between Schwarzenegger and Reitman on Twins (1988) which grossed $217 million worldwide and Kindergarten Cop (1990) which grossed $202 million, Variety's Leonard Klady predicted that the film, which opened the day before Thanksgiving, would be the biggest of the season. The film was the biggest to open over the Thanksgiving weekend with a gross of $10 million in 3 days but was only placed fourth overall for the weekend with just half the gross of The Santa Clause. In North America, the film did not perform as expected and only grossed slightly more than half its budget ($37 million vs. $60 million) but grossed a total of $108 million worldwide.

Critical response
On Rotten Tomatoes, the film has a 39% approval rating with an average score of 5/10, based on 36 collected reviews. The critical consensus reads: "Even with an abundance of talent behind and in front of the camera, Junior doesn't quite deliver enough laughs to nurse its zany high-concept idea." On Metacritic it has a weighted average score of 59% based on reviews from 25 critics, indicating "mixed or average reviews". Audiences polled by CinemaScore gave the film an average grade of "B+" on an A+ to F scale.

Roger Ebert was a fan of the film, giving it 3½ out of four stars and maintaining that: "I know this sounds odd, but Schwarzenegger is perfect for the role. Observe his acting carefully in Junior, and you'll see skills that many 'serious' actors could only envy." On the television show At the Movies Ebert and Gene Siskel gave the film "two thumbs up".
Variety wrote: "What separates this straightforward chuckler from the pack is its shrewd reliance on character rather than plot, and that human dimension proves surprisingly poignant."

Comedian and former Mystery Science Theater 3000 host Michael J. Nelson named the film the second-worst comedy ever made.

Accolades

Year-end lists
 Top 3 Runner-ups (not ranked) – Sandi Davis, The Oklahoman
 Honorable mention –  Glenn Lovell, San Jose Mercury News
 Honorable mention – Michael MacCambridge, Austin American-Statesman

See also
 List of American films of 1994
 Rabbit Test (1978), a comedy film with a similar premise, starring Billy Crystal.
 A Slightly Pregnant Man (1973), an earlier French film by Jacques Demy, with Marcello Mastroianni playing the man who becomes pregnant.
 Thomas Beatie (also known as "The Pregnant Man"), an American trans man who became pregnant.
 Kentaro Hiyama's First Pregnancy, a Japanese manga that takes place in a future where male pregnancy is a semi-common occurrence.
 He's Expecting, a Japanese live-action drama based on the manga.

References

External links
 

1994 comedy films
1990s buddy comedy films
American buddy comedy films
1990s English-language films
Films about scientists
Films scored by James Newton Howard
Films directed by Ivan Reitman
Films set in California
Films shot in California
Films shot in San Francisco
Medical-themed films
American pregnancy films
Universal Pictures films
Films produced by Ivan Reitman
Films with screenplays by Kevin Wade
1990s pregnancy films
1990s American films